John Birch may refer to:
 John Birch (soldier) (1615–1691), English politician and soldier
 John Birch (died 1735) ( 1666–1735), nephew of the soldier, MP for Weobley
 John Birch (surgeon) (1745–1815), English surgeon and anti-vaccination activist
 John Birch (engineer) (1867–1945), English designer of pushbikes and automobiles
 John Birch (rugby league) (1878–1955), English rugby player
 John Birch, received 1879 a U.S. patent for the first cash register
 John Birch (missionary) (1918–1945), American military intelligence officer and missionary
 John Birch Society (established 1958), the organization named after him
 John Birch (luthier) (1922–2000), English luthier
 John Birch (musician) (1929–2012), British organist and choral director
 John Birch (diplomat) (1935–2020), British diplomat
 John Birch (cricketer) (born 1955), English cricketer

See also
John Burch (disambiguation)